James Allen Rhodes (September 13, 1909 – March 4, 2001) was an American Republican politician who served as Governor of Ohio from 1963 to 1971 and again from 1975 to 1983. , Rhodes was one of only seven U.S. governors to serve four four-year terms in office.  Rhodes is tied for the sixth-longest gubernatorial tenure in post-Constitutional U.S. history at 5,840 days. He also served as Mayor of Columbus from 1944 to 1952 and Ohio State Auditor from 1953 to 1963.

On May 3, 1970, Rhodes sent National Guard troops onto the Kent State University campus at the request of Kent, Ohio mayor LeRoy Satrom  after the ROTC building was burned down by unknown arsonists the previous night. On May 4, Guardsmen killed four students and wounded nine others.

Early life and education 
Rhodes was born in Coalton, Ohio, to James and Susan Howe Rhodes, who were of Welsh descent. Rhodes has commented that the reason he and his family were Republicans was because of the respect his father, a mine superintendent, had for John L. Lewis, a prominent Republican union activist. When Rhodes was nine, his father died, and the family moved to north Springfield where Rhodes graduated from Springfield High School where he played on the football team. Subsequently, the family moved again, this time to Columbus, because Rhodes earned a modest basketball scholarship to Ohio State University. Although Rhodes dropped out after his first quarter he is often described as a "student" or "alumnus" of Ohio State.

After dropping out of college, Rhodes opened a business called Jim's Place across from the university on North High Street. Jim's Place has been described as a place where one could buy anything, from doughnuts and hamburgers to stag film, or place bets on numbers games.

Political career

Mayor of Columbus, 1944–1952 
In 1934, Rhodes began to use his position as a local businessman to climb up the Columbus political ladder, starting on a ward committee. In 1937, Rhodes won his first elected office as a member of the Columbus Board of Education. He was then twice elected as Columbus city auditor in 1939 and 1941. Then in 1943, Rhodes was elected as Mayor of Columbus, becoming the youngest major city mayor in the U.S. at age 34.

Rhodes's time as mayor is primarily marked by two achievements, with the first being his convincing of 67% of Columbus voters to approve the city's first income tax, and the second being his successful use of water gun diplomacy to annex much of the surrounding suburbs to Columbus. As surrounding communities grew or were constructed, they came to require access to waterlines, which was under the sole control of the municipal water system. Rhodes told these communities that if they wanted water, they would have to submit to assimilation into Columbus. As a result of this, Columbus, Ohio, currently has the largest land area of any Ohio city.

Ohio Governor 
With an eye on the governorship, Rhodes was elected State Auditor in 1952, and took office in early 1953. In 1954, Rhodes ran against the popular incumbent, Democratic governor Frank Lausche, and lost by a 54% to 46% margin. In 1962, Rhodes ran again for governor – this time against Democratic incumbent Mike DiSalle. Rhodes's campaign centered on "jobs and progress," and in speeches Rhodes routinely claimed that an increase in jobs would lead to a decrease in everything from crime and divorce, to mental illness. Rhodes also made DiSalle's tax increases, such as the gas tax, a prominent part of his campaign. Rhodes also weathered a minor scandal when Democratic State Chairman alleged that Rhodes diverted and borrowed a total of $54,000 from his campaign funds. During a debate, both Rhodes and DiSalle agreed that this was, "the most vicious campaign [of] the Ohio governorship." On November 6, 1962, Ohioans voted Rhodes into the governorship with 59% of the vote.

Rhodes served two terms as governor, and he also was a "favorite son" Presidential candidate who controlled the Ohio delegation to the Republican National Conventions in 1964 and 1968, before retiring in 1971. He ran for the U.S. Senate in 1970 and narrowly lost, to U.S. Representative Robert Taft Jr., in the primary election, which was two days after the events at Kent State.

Rhodes oversaw the last two (by electrocution) pre-Furman executions in Ohio, which were both in early 1963, before Ohio resumed executions in 1999. In 1983 Rhodes pardoned boxing promoter Don King for a 1967 non‐negligent manslaughter conviction of stomping one of his employees to death.

At a news conference in Kent, Ohio, on Sunday May 3, 1970, the day before the Kent State shootings, he said of campus protesters:

They're worse than the Brownshirts, and the Communist element, and also the Night Riders, and the vigilantes. They're the worst type of people that we harbor in America.

Since the Ohio Constitution limits the governor to two four-year terms, when Rhodes initially filed to run again in 1974, his petitions were refused by the Secretary of State. Rhodes sued, and the Ohio Supreme Court ruled that the limitation was on consecutive terms, thus freeing him to return to office by narrowly defeating incumbent John Gilligan in an upset in the 1974 election. He served two more terms before retiring again in 1983. During the energy crisis of the winter of 1976–77, Rhodes led a 15-minute service, in which he "beseech[ed] God to relieve the storm." The next year, January 1978, amid a blizzard which dropped 31 inches of snow onto Ohio and killed 60 people in the Northeast, Rhodes called the storm "the greatest disaster in Ohio history."

On August 16, 1977 Rhodes was hit in the face and shoulder with a banana cream pie thrown by Steve Conliff, as about 25 young people disrupted the opening of the Ohio State Fair. Conliff then ran unsuccessfully against Rhodes for the Republican nomination.

Rhodes ran for the governorship again in 1986, seeking a record-breaking fifth term, but soundly lost to the incumbent Dick Celeste, whom Rhodes had narrowly defeated in his last successful gubernatorial bid in 1978.

Literary
Rhodes co-authored stories of historical fiction with Dean Jauchius, including The Trial of Mary Todd Lincoln, The Court-Martial of Oliver Hazard Perry and Johnny Shiloh, a novel of the Civil War. The last was adapted to a 1963 television movie by Walt Disney, also called Johnny Shiloh, for which Rhodes received writer's credit.

Personal life
From 1941 to her death in 1987, Rhodes was married to Helen Rawlins. They had three children.

In 1995, Rhodes suffered a stroke, resulting in him needing to use a wheelchair. He was hospitalized due to pneumonia in December 2000 and January 2001. On March 4, 2001, Rhodes died at Ohio State University Medical Center in Columbus of heart issues. He is interred at Green Lawn Cemetery, Columbus, Ohio.

Legacy
Numerous buildings and sites around the state have been named in Rhodes's honor, including:

The James A. Rhodes State Office Tower – the tallest building in Columbus
Statue in front of namesake office tower in Columbus
Cleveland State University's Rhodes Tower in Cleveland
The Ohio State University Medical Center's Rhodes Hall - the main building of University Hospital
The James A. Rhodes Arena (locally nicknamed as "The JAR") at the University of Akron
James A. Rhodes State College in Lima, Ohio.
The Rhodes Center at the Ohio Expo Center and State Fair in Columbus
The James A. Rhodes Appalachian Highway, Ohio State Route 32
The James A. Rhodes Athletic Center, Shawnee State University

Electoral history

1962 Election 

Jim Rhodes won the gubernatorial election, defeating sitting Governor Michael DiSalle 58.92% to 41.08%.

1966 Election 

Jim Rhodes won a second term, defeating Frazier Reams Jr. 62.18% to 37.82%

1974 Election 

Jim Rhodes won a third term, defeating sitting Governor John J. Gilligan 48.62% to 48.25%.

1978 Election 

Jim Rhodes won a fourth term, defeating Dick Celeste 49.31% to 47.64%.

1986 Election 

Jim Rhodes sought a fifth term at the age of seventy-seven, losing to sitting Governor Dick Celeste 39.4% to 60.6%. This was his last campaign for Governor and the only one to end in defeat.

Notes

References

Bibliography

External links 

 
Jim Rhodes at Political Graveyard
 Ohio Expo Center
 Ohio State Fair

1909 births
2001 deaths
20th-century American businesspeople
American people of Welsh descent
Burials at Green Lawn Cemetery (Columbus, Ohio)
Businesspeople from Ohio
Republican Party governors of Ohio
Mayors of Columbus, Ohio
Ohio State University alumni
People from Jackson County, Ohio
School board members in Ohio
State Auditors of Ohio
Candidates in the 1964 United States presidential election
Candidates in the 1968 United States presidential election
20th-century American politicians
Writers from Columbus, Ohio